Pierre-Yves Nicolas Polomat (born 27 December 1993) is a French professional footballer who plays as a left-back for  club Versailles.

Club career
Polomat moved to France in 2008 to join the academy of Marseille, which he left two years later, following off-the-field problems. He subsequently joined Saint-Étienne in 2010, following a successful two-week trial. He made his debut in a 3–0 win against Lorient in the Coupe de la Ligue on 26 September 2012. A regular in the reserves, Polomat joined Châteauroux on loan on 31 January 2014 to gain first-team experience. He was ruled out for two months after heavily spraining his ankle in his first game for the club.

The following season, he was once again loaned in Ligue 2, this time to Laval.

International career
Polomat was a member of the France under-20 squad that won the 2013 FIFA U-20 World Cup. He made two substitute appearances during the tournament, including a brief cameo in the final against Uruguay.

Honours

International
FIFA U-20 World Cup: 2013

References

External links
 
 
 
 

1993 births
Living people
Sportspeople from Fort-de-France
French footballers
Martiniquais footballers
France youth international footballers
French people of Martiniquais descent
Association football fullbacks
AS Saint-Étienne players
LB Châteauroux players
Stade Lavallois players
AJ Auxerre players
Gençlerbirliği S.K. footballers
FC Versailles 78 players
Ligue 1 players
Ligue 2 players
Süper Lig players
French expatriate footballers
Martiniquais expatriate footballers
Expatriate footballers in Turkey
French expatriate sportspeople in Turkey
Martiniquais expatriate sportspeople in Turkey